Liberty Technology Magnet High School is a public magnet high school located in Jackson, Tennessee. It opened to students in August 2003. It is a part of the Jackson-Madison County School System.

History 
Liberty Technology Magnet High School is one of the youngest high schools in the Jackson-Madison County area. Its construction took place between 2002 and 2003. The cost for the school's construction was nearly $16 million. In 2009, Liberty became a Title I school.

Campus 
The outside campus includes a football stadium, football practice field, band practice field, a soccer field, and both baseball and softball fields. The football stadium is surrounded by a track and can seat up to 1,600 people. The auditorium seats up to 999 people, and the gymnasium has a capacity of 2,150.

Classes
Liberty uses block scheduling, with classes typically lasting 90 minutes, as opposed to the 45 minute classes used conventionally by schools in the United States.

In 2009, Liberty Technology Magnet High School had 15 students for every full-time equivalent teacher. The Tennessee average is 15 students per full-time equivalent teacher.

Athletics 
Liberty won a TSSAA class 2A basketball state championship in 2005-2006.

Notable alumni

Kendall Anthony (born 1993), basketball player in the Israeli National League

References

External links 
Liberty Technology Magnet High School home page

Educational institutions established in 2003
Public high schools in Tennessee
Schools in Madison County, Tennessee
Jackson, Tennessee
Magnet schools in Tennessee
2003 establishments in Tennessee